Sohawal State was a princely state of the Bagelkhand Agency of the British Raj.
It was a relatively small Sanad state of about 552 km2 with a population of 32,216 inhabitants in 1901. Its capital was at Sohawal, a small town — 2,108 inhabitants in 1901 — located in modern Satna district of Madhya Pradesh.

The state was divided in two sections separated by territory belonging to Kothi State and in its northern side it formed little enclaves within neighbouring Panna State.

History
Sohawal State was founded in the mid sixteenth century by a ruler named Fateh Singh. It had been originally much larger, but lost much territory within the first centuries of its existence.

Sohawal became a British protectorate initially subordinate to Panna State, but a separate sanad was granted to Rais Aman Singh in 1809. During the 1830 – 1833 period there was an interregnum in which Sohawal came under direct British administration.

The last ruler of Sohawal signed the instrument of accession to the Indian Union on 1 January 1950.

Rulers
The rulers used the title of Rais and after 1911 they adopted the title Raja.

Title Rais
1550 – ....                Fateh Singh
.... – ....                ....
.... – 1750                Prithipal Singh
.... – ....                .... (four rulers)
bf.1809 – 18..             Lal Aman Singh (1st time)
18.. – 1830                Raghunath Singh                    (d. 1830/33)
1830 – 1833                Vacant
1833 – 1840                Lal Aman Singh (2nd time)
1840 – 1865                Sheo Singh                         (d. 1865)
 1 November 1865 – 1899         Sher Jang Bahadur Singh            (b. 1853 – d. 1899) (personal style Raja from 1 January 1879)
23 Nov 1899 – 1911         Bhagwant Raj Bahadur Singh         (b. 1878 – d. 1930)

Title Raja
1911 – 16 February 1930         Bhagwant Raj Bahadur Singh         (s.a.)
1930 – 15 August 1947         Jagendra Bahadur Singh             (b. 1899 – d. 1974)

See also
Political integration of India
Vindhya Pradesh

References

Princely states of India
Satna district
Rajputs
1550 establishments in India